Alan Fletcher (born 30 March 1957) is an Australian actor of stage, television and film and musician.

Fletcher is best known for TV soap opera Neighbours, as Karl Kennedy. His on-screen wife is played by Jackie Woodburne, who coincidentally had previously played his sister in TV procedural drama Cop Shop.

Having appeared in the series since 1994, Fletcher is the third longest serving actor in an Australian television serial, after Home and Away actors Ray Meagher and Lynne McGranger.

Career
Fletcher was born in Perth, Western Australia, and attended Wesley College in Perth. His first major role was in the police drama Cop Shop from 1982 until production ceased the following year. Prior to this, he appeared in a few episodes of the US series The Love Boat (1981) and various Australian feature films, TV movies, and miniseries including Fran and Mercy Mission. He briefly acted in Neighbours in 1987 as Greg Cooper, a run-down, dishonest boxer working in Jim Robinson's (Alan Dale) garage. In 1994, Fletcher successfully auditioned for the role of Karl Kennedy in the soap, a role which he continues to play.

In 2005, Fletcher starred as Henry Higgins in a production of My Fair Lady at the Melbourne Comedy Theatre. He is also a prominent member of the Media, Entertainment and Arts Alliance, a role which saw him become a vocal critic of the 2004 US-Australia Free Trade Agreement, including an appearance on the political talk-show Meet the Press.

In 2008, Fletcher starred as Frank McGee in the workshop performance season of Call Girl the Musical and as Captain Hook in the Pantomime Peter Pan at His Majesty's Theatre, Aberdeen.

In 2011, Fletcher spent time in Old Melbourne Gaol to raise money for the charity Whitelion. In order to break out, Fletcher and fellow Neighbours cast members Stefan Dennis, Jordy Lucas and Valentina Novakovic had to each raise $1,000.

In May 2013, along with Saskia Hampele, he presented the award of Best Newcomer to Joseph Thompson at the British Soap Awards. Fletcher appeared in a documentary special celebrating Neighbours 30th anniversary titled Neighbours 30th: The Stars Reunite, which aired in Australia and the UK in March 2015.

Musical career

Fletcher is also the lead singer in a band called Waiting Room, with other members including Tommy Rando, Chris Hawker and drummer Jeff Consi. They have toured the United Kingdom several times. With a handful of their own songs they incorporate a selection of cover versions into their set. Fletcher also covers Smokie's "Living Next Door to Alice", substituting Alice, for "Susan", his on-screen wife (Jackie Woodburne). Their single, So Wrong, was released on iTunes on 26 November 2007, followed by their album, Live at the Elephant, on 17 December 2007.

On 30 November 2007, Fletcher performed a cover of Oasis' "Wonderwall" for BBC Radio 1's Live Lounge.

In December 2008, Fletcher played a solo gig in Aberdeen, playing a mixture of covers and Waiting Room material. He followed this with a second gig in the city on 3 January 2009 at The Lemon Tree.

On 15 May 2009, Fletcher announced via his official website that he was to tour the UK with a new band, The X-Rays due to the economic situation of bringing Waiting Room with him. The tour took place in September and October 2009 and featured some original Waiting Room material. The X-Rays are UK based musicians Johnny Lucas, Chris Hanby and Martin Stewart. Fletcher continues to perform each week in Melbourne with Waiting Room.

In September 2010, Fletcher announced on his official website that he will be touring the UK with Tommy Rando in November and December of that year. On 28 November 2010, during his UK tour, Fletcher appeared on The Xtra Factor to discuss the potential winners of the show.

In September 2012, Fletcher played a charity gig at the Shepherd's Bush branch of the pub chain Walkabout in aid of Blue September, a charity raising funds for cancer research.

Fletcher was a contestant on the UK TV show Soapstar Superstar, in January 2007 finishing in sixth place. He performed the following songs:
 Day 1: Faith (George Michael)
 Day 2: Bridge Over Troubled Water (Simon & Garfunkel)
 Day 3: Tears in Heaven (Eric Clapton)
 Day 4: Can't Take My Eyes Off You (Andy Williams)
 Day 5: Don't Let the Sun Go Down on Me (Elton John)

In 2013, Fletcher released a Christmas single, If You Want A Happy Christmas, on which he collaborated with The Pacific Belles.

Photography and travel
In 2018, Fletcher combined his interests in travel and photography in a reality television program Photo Number 6. Fletcher explores the world with actor and director, Stig Wemyss, as they seek travel experiences that go beyond the tourist guidebook and delve into the heart and soul of the places. They look for photographic images that encapsulate emotion, geography and human connections.

Personal life
Fletcher is married to Jennifer Hansen, a former newsreader for the Ten Network and they have two children. Fletcher supports Essendon Football Club and Liverpool Football Club.

Fletcher is an ambassador for Blue September, a charity that raises awareness of all cancers that can affect men. In 2011, Fletcher helped launch the charity in Britain.

In 2022, following media reports about his health, Fletcher revealed that he had been diagnosed with alopecia areata.

References

External links
 
 

1957 births
Living people
Male actors from Perth, Western Australia
Australian people of English descent
People educated at Wesley College, Perth
Australian male film actors
Australian male soap opera actors
20th-century Australian male actors
21st-century Australian male actors